Jiagou may refer to these towns in Anhui, China:

Jiagou, Huainan
Jiagou, Suzhou, Anhui